Upper Lead Mountain Pond is a lake in Hancock County, Maine, United States. The inflow to Bear Pond comes from several small stream, and it drains via a small  stream to Middle/Lower Lead Mountain Pond. Several unpaved roads provide access to the lake and private residences surrounding it. The Lake is surrounded by forest and supports several fish, including landlocked Atlantic salmon, brook trout, white perch, yellow perch, and chain pickerel.

References

Lakes of Hancock County, Maine
Glacial lakes of the United States
Lakes of Maine